Events from the year 1241 in Ireland.

Incumbent
Lord: Henry III

Events
10 May – (in Irish mythology) Battle of Cameirge in Ulster: the Milesian Irish septs of the Ó Dónaills from Donegal, the Ó Néills from Armagh and the Ó Dochartaighs of Connacht defeat the last Tuatha Dé Danann sept, the Meic Lochlainn of Tír Eoghain and Inishowen under Domhnall mac Muirchertaigh Mac Lochlainn. From now on the Kings of Tír Eoghain will all be of the Ó Néill dynasty, Brian Ua Néill becoming sole ruler.
Dominican friary at Athenry founded by the de Bermingham family.
Justice Henry of Bath is on a mission in Ireland.

Deaths
Walter de Lacy, Lord of Meath (born c.1172).
Domhnall (Mór) Ó Domhnaill.
Domhnall mac Muirchertaigh Mac Lochlainn, King of Tír Eoghain.

References